The standard-winged nightjar (Caprimulgus longipennis) is a nocturnal bird in the nightjar family.

Distribution and habitat
It is a resident breeder in Africa from Senegal east to Ethiopia. It is found in dry savannah habitats, with some scrub.

Description
In normal flight, these feathers trail behind, but in display flight they are raised vertically like standards. Outside the breeding season, there are no plumage distinctions between the male and female.

When roosting on the ground during the day, this medium-sized ( long) nightjar is mainly variegated grey, with a browner collar. 
It is a shadowy form with easy, silent moth-like flight; this nightjar is relatively short-tailed, and lacks white in the wings or tail. The song is a churring trill.

Behaviour

Like other nightjars, the standard-winged nightjar feeds on insects in flight, the huge gape opening wide for moths and beetles. It flies at dusk, most often at sundown, and can sometimes be seen with flying foxes.

No nest is made; the two elongated and elliptical eggs are placed upon the bare ground.

References

standard-winged nightjar
Birds of Sub-Saharan Africa
standard-winged nightjar